Sanchugovo is a rural locality (a village) in Malyshevskoye Rural Settlement, Selivanovsky District, Vladimir Oblast, Russia. The population was 6 as of 2010.

Geography 
Sanchugovo is located 30 km south of Krasnaya Gorbatka (the district's administrative centre) by road. Gubino is the nearest rural locality.

References 

Rural localities in Selivanovsky District